Caloptilia oxydelta is a moth of the family Gracillariidae. It is known from Karnataka, India; Java, Indonesia; and Vietnam.

The larvae feed on Flueggia acidoton and Flueggia virosa. They mine the leaves of their host plant.

References

oxydelta
Moths of Asia
Moths described in 1908